Hansch or Hänsch or at times Haensch is a German surname. Notable people with the surname include:

Persons

Hansch
Anton Hansch (1813–1876), Austrian painter
Corwin Hansch (1918–2011), American chemist and academic

Hänsch
Klaus Hänsch (born 1938), German politician
Ralph Hansch (1924–2008), Canadian ice hockey player
Theodor W. Hänsch (born 1941), German physicist

Haensch
Annemarie Haensch, German table tennis player
Günther Haensch (1923–2018), German linguist and lexicographer
Richard Haensch German entomologist and insect dealer

See also
Haenschia, a genus of clearwing (ithomiine) butterflies, named by Lamas in 2004. They are in the brush-footed butterfly family, Nymphalidae. The name honours German entomologist and insect dealer Richard Haensch.
"Hänschen klein" by Franz Wiedemann (1821–1882), German folk song and children's song originating in the Biedermeier period of the 19th century. The song's English translation is "Little Hans".

German-language surnames
Surnames from given names